Alice Austen is an American playwright, screenwriter, and producer known for writing and producing the critically acclaimed 2019 film Give Me Liberty.

Biography
Austen grew up in the Pacific Northwest. She attended the University of Oregon in Eugene, where she ran on the women’s track team.

While at Harvard Law School, Austen co-founded the Harvard Human Rights Journal. She represented the Ministry of Industry in Václav Havel’s nascent Czech government. Austen studied creative writing under Seamus Heaney.

Austen is a past resident at the Royal Court Theatre. Her playwrighting credits include Water,  La Musica, and Ninth Man Out at Goodman Theater. Water was a 2006-07 season the Jeff Award Nominee. Her credits with Steppenwolf Theatre include Next Stop and George Orwell’s Animal Farm, which was noted for “its removal of Orwell's dystopian story from its overtly British agrarian setting: The famous anthem "Beasts of England" is now rendered as "Beasts of Earth"”, – wrote Chris Jones of The Chicago Tribune. “A remarkable script, solidifies why this novel and its impact reverberates throughout the world today“ (Newcity Stage).

Girls in the Boat, premiered in 2018 at The First Stage Children's Theater, is a “fast-paced script, which mimics the intensity of an actual sporting event. Audiences dare not blink or they might lose track of a gesture or a thread of a conversation” (Shepherd Express).

Austen won the John Cassavetes Award for Give Me Liberty at the 35th Independent Spirit Awards.

She is a co-founder with Kirill Mikhanovsky of Give Me Liberty, Mfg., a Milwaukee-based film and TV production company.

Filmography

Awards and nominations

References

External links

 Alice Austen at the Dramatists Guild of America
 Alice Austen at the Independent Spirit Awards

American women dramatists and playwrights
American women screenwriters
American women film producers
Oregon Ducks women's track and field athletes
Harvard Law School alumni
Living people
Year of birth missing (living people)